Lunar system may refer to:

Earth–Moon system
The Hill sphere of a moon
Subsatellite, a natural or artificial satellite orbiting another natural satellite
Lunar calendar, a calendar system based on Earth's moon